Betsey may refer to:

 Betsey (ship); one of many vessels that have been named Betsey
 Betsey Island, Tasmania, Australia

People 
Betsey Armstrong (born 1983), female water polo goalkeeper from the United States
Betsey Bayless, the Republican Secretary of State of Arizona 1997–2003
Betsey Guppy Chamberlain (1797–1886), Native American writer of sketches and poetry
Betsey Mix Cowles (1810–1876), early leader in the United States abolitionist movement
Betsey Johnson (born 1942), American fashion designer
Betsey Ann Stearns (1830-1914), American inventor
Betsey Stevenson, economist, Associate Professor of Public Policy at the University of Michigan
Betsey Stockton (1798–1865), African-American educator and missionary
Betsey Cushing Roosevelt Whitney (1908–1998), American philanthropist, daughter-in-law of President Franklin D. Roosevelt
Betsey Wright (born 1943), American lobbyist, activist, and political consultant who worked for Bill Clinton in Arkansas
Betsey Wynne (born 1778), the main author of the extensive Wynne Diaries, wife of the Royal Navy officer Thomas Fremantle (1765–1819)

Other 
Betsey Brown, African-American literature young-adult fiction novel by Ntozake Shange, published in 1985
XOX Betsey Johnson, American reality television series on the Style Network
Betsey Trotwood, fictional character from Charles Dickens' 1850 novel David Copperfield

See also
Bese (disambiguation)
Bete (disambiguation)
Betsy